is a psalm setting by William Byrd. He wrote the motet, setting a paraphrase of Psalm 150 in Latin for five-part choir. It was published in his 1591 collection Cantiones sacrae.

History 
Psalm 150, the final psalm of the Book of Psalms, calls to praise God in music, listing nine types of instruments. It has inspired composers such as Anton Bruckner, Igor Stravinsky, and Benjamin Britten.

Byrd was one of the most notable composers of the Tudor period. He composed especially sacred music for the Catholic Church, but it was also performed in the Anglican Church.

 is a setting of a paraphrase of Psalm. It became the opening piece of his second collection of sacred vocal music, Cantiones sacrae, published in 1591.

Music 
Byrd's psalm setting  is in 16th-century madrigal style, featuring syncopes and onomatopoeic word settings. In a triple metre, it has at times dance character. It is set for five voices, two sopranos, alto, tenor and bass.

Recordings 
The beginning became the title of a collection of Byrd's sacred motets, which features the piece as the conclusion. It was recorded by The Cardinall's Musick conducted by Andrew Carwood in 2006. The recording is volume 10 of The Byrd Edition.

References

External links 

 
 

Psalm settings
1883 compositions
Choral compositions